Biga may refer to:

Places 
 Biga, Çanakkale, a town and district of Çanakkale Province in Turkey
 Sanjak of Biga, an Ottoman province
 Biga Çayı, a river in Çanakkale Province
 Biga Peninsula, a peninsula in Turkey, in the northwest part of Anatolia

Other uses 
 Biga (bread baking), a type of pre-fermentation used in Italian baking
 Biga and Busca, two political factions in the 15th century Catalan Civil War
 Biga (typeface)
 Biga (chariot), a two-horse chariot used in ancient Mediterranean countries
 Bigha, a unit of land area used in North India
 Biga language, an Austronesian language of West Papua, Indonesia

See also 
 Bigeh, an island in the River Nile
 Biga Ranx (born 1988), French musician